British Forces Broadcasting Service radio in Northern Ireland is based at Thiepval Barracks, Lisburn. BFBS Northern Ireland is available on 1287 AM in military Bases across the Province & on 100.6 FM in the Lisburn city area.

The station was launched at 10:06am on Monday 8 May 2006 with local school pupil Ceri McNelly being the first voice heard on-air.

BFBS NI Reception

FM
 100.6 MHz Lisburn air date: June 2006
Further Community Stations with local and shared programmes across the Province began broadcasting on 5 March 2008.
 101.0 MHz Holywood
 106.5 MHz Aldergrove / Antrim
 107.5 MHz Ballykinler

A station in Ballykelly was shut down on 12 March 2008 due to base closure.

DTT
live programmes through 'freeview' around the world

AM
BFBS Northern Ireland also used to broadcast on AM as the first ever forces station in the UK (since 1994)

 Girdwood Barracks, Belfast (until closure August 2005)
 Omagh (until closure 11 August 2006)
 Portadown (until closure June 2006)
 Ballymena (until closure 3 April 2007)
 Bessbrook (until closure June 2007)
 Crossmaglen/Forkhill bases in South Armagh until closure-2006.
 Lisburn (converted to FM May 2006)

Lisburn
Radio stations in Northern Ireland
Mass media in County Antrim
Radio stations established in 1994